COC may refer to:

Terms
 Certificate of Conformity, see type approval
 Chain of Command, following orders based on others' authority within the group.
 Chain of custody, the chronological record of a sample or evidence
 Circle of confusion, the optical term for a blurred spot which is the image of an out-of-focus point source
 Cleveland open-cup method, a method used in chemistry for determining a substance's flashpoint
 Code of conduct, a set of rules and regulations for organizations and events
 Cost of capital, an investment principal

Organizations
 Canadian Olympic Committee, a private organization representing Canadian athletes in the International Olympic Committee and the Pan American Games
 Canadian Opera Company, Toronto-based opera company
 Chamber of commerce,  a form of business network
 Chinese Olympic Committee, represents People's Republic of China in handling international affairs related to the Olympic Movement
 Christian Outreach Centre, former name of International Network of Churches (INC), an Australian network of Pentecostal churches 
 Christian Outreach College (disambiguation), several schools linked to the INC
 Clinical Officers Council, a government agency that regulates the training, registration and licensing of Clinical officers in Kenya
 COC Nederland, the Dutch abbreviation for the earliest homophile organisation, founded in 1946
 Colombian Olympic Committee, the non-profit organization representing Colombia athletes in the International Olympic Committee
 The Company of Chivalry, an historical reenactment group
 Consortium of Consortia, the organization now known as the International Coalition of Library Consortia
 Corporation of Chennai, the civic agency in the city of Chennai, India
 Corporation of Coimbatore, India
 The Council of Canadians, a citizen's organization founded to oppose the Canada-U.S. Free Trade Agreement
 Croatian Olympic Committee, the non-profit organization representing Croatian athletes in the International Olympic Committee
 United States Chamber of Commerce, an American business federation

Music
 Carnival of Chaos, an album by GWAR
 Carnival of Carnage, an album by horrorcore hip-hop duo, the Insane Clown Posse
 Chemistry of Consciousness, an album by thrash metal band Toxic Holocaust
 Children of the Corn (group), a hip hop group composed of Cam'ron, Big L, Bloodshed and Herb McGruff
 City of Caterpillar, an Emo/Screamo band
 Corrosion of Conformity, a heavy metal band from the American South

Other
 Calculus of constructions, a formal language in which both computer programs and mathematical proofs can be expressed
 The Call of Cthulhu, a short story
 Cagayan de Oro College, a college in Cagayan de Oro, Philippines
 Call of Cthulhu (role-playing game)
 Captains of Crush Grippers, a brand of torsion-spring grippers
 Chip on chip, an extension of surface-mount technology
 Churches of Christ, a restorationist Christian denomination
 Clash of Civilizations, a theory of political science
 Clash of Clans, a freemium mobile MMO strategy video game by Supercell
 Georgia Institute of Technology College of Computing at the Georgia Institute of Technology, USA
 College of the Canyons, a two-year community college located in Santa Clarita, California
 Combined oral contraceptive pill, a medical method of birth control
 Commandant of cadets, the head faculty position responsible for cadet training within any U.S. Federal military academy:
 List of Commandants of Cadets of the United States Air Force Academy
 List of Commandants of Cadets of the United States Military Academy
 Community of Christ, previously known as the Reorganized Church of Jesus Christ of Latter Day Saints
 Convention over configuration, a software design paradigm which seeks to decrease the number of decisions that developers need to make
 Corcoran station, an Amtrak station in California, United States whose station code is COC
 Cup of China, a figure skater competition
 Cyclic olefin copolymer, the chemical name for a plastic engineering resin
 Continuum of Care, a program designed to promote community-wide commitment to the goal of ending homelessness

See also 
 Tritenii de Jos (formerly called Coc), a commune in Cluj County, Romania
 Chain of command (disambiguation)
 Chronicles of Chaos (disambiguation)